Cyperus afroalpinus is a species of sedge that is native to Africa and was described by the botanist Kåre Arnstein Lye in 1983.

Description

Distribution and habitat
It is found in tropical parts of central Africa in Tanzania, Uganda, Zaïre and Kenya where it is commonly situated in clearings in upper montane forest communities at elevations of  where it is associated with bamboo and giant heath.

See also
List of Cyperus species

References

afroalpinus
Flora of Africa
Plants described in 1983
Taxa named by Kåre Arnstein Lye